Fibuloides modificana is a moth of the family Tortricidae. It is known from China (Guangxi) and Vietnam.

References

Enarmoniini
Moths described in 1997